George Scott (29 September 1885 – 16 August 1916) was an English footballer.

Scott started his football career with Sunderland District Amateur League sides Braeside and Sunderland West End, before joining Clapton Orient in July 1908. He featured regularly throughout the next seven seasons, playing in various positions and scoring an average of five goals per season in all competitions. His most valuable goals included the only goal of the game in Orient's victory over Tottenham Hotspur at White Hart Lane on 9 April 1909. In 1911, Scott was selected for a London XI to face a Paris XI in France.

At the outbreak of World War I professional football was suspended, and Scott joined the 17th Middlesex Regiment, the "Footballers' Battalion", along with many other Orient players and staff. During the Battle of the Somme, Scott was wounded and taken prisoner, and died at a German military hospital on 16 August 1916. Scott was one of three Orient players killed in the war, along with William Jonas and Richard McFadden. He is buried at St. Souplet British Cemetery, a few miles south of Le Cateau.

References

1885 births
1916 deaths
Footballers from Sunderland
English footballers
Sunderland West End F.C. players
Leyton Orient F.C. players
English Football League players
British Army personnel of World War I
British military personnel killed in the Battle of the Somme
Middlesex Regiment soldiers
Association football midfielders
Military personnel from County Durham